Born Reckless is a 1930 American pre-Code crime film directed by John Ford and staged by Andrew Bennison from a screenplay written by Dudley Nichols based on the novel Louis Beretti. The film starred Edmund Lowe, Catherine Dale Owen and Marguerite Churchill.

Plot
A gangster, Louis Beretti, gets caught involved in a jewelry heist and taken to see the judge. The war has begun and hoping to use the publicity to get re-elected, the judge offers Louis and his two buddies, the choice of going to jail, or signing up to fight in the war - if they prove themselves, he will throw away their arrests.

Louis makes it home from the war (one of his buddies was killed), and opens up a night club downtown that becomes very successful. His employees are former members of his gang, and he maintains contact with "Big", still a gangster.

Louis falls for the sister of his buddy who was killed in the war, but she already has plans to marry. He tells her nevertheless, that if she ever needs him, she should call and he will come. When her baby is kidnapped (her husband is away), she does call for Louis and he realizes that the kidnapping has been done by "Big" and the gang. Louis goes to save the baby and confront those of the gang who have taken part in the kidnapping. Shots are exchanged.

After he returns the baby to his mother, Louis goes back to his nightclub where "Big" is waiting. They talk of old times though they realize they will need to shoot it out, which they do...

Cast
Edmund Lowe as Louis Beretti
Catherine Dale Owen as Joan Sheldon
Frank Albertson as Frank Sheldon
Marguerite Churchill as Rosa Beretti
William Harrigan as Good News Brophy
Lee Tracy as Bill O'Brien
Warren Hymer as Big Shot
Ilka Chase as High Society Customer at Beretti's
Ferike Boros as Ma Beretti
Paul Porcasi as Pa Beretti
Ben Bard as Joe Bergman
Eddie Gribbon as Bugs
Mike Donlin as Fingy Moscovitz
Paul Page as Ritzy Reilly
Roy Stewart as District Attorney Cardigan
Jack Pennick as Sergeant
Ward Bond as Sergeant
Yola d'Avril as French Girl
Randolph Scott as Dick Milburn
John Wayne as Soldier (uncredited)
 Pat Somerset as Duke

References

External links

1930 films
American black-and-white films
Films directed by John Ford
1930s crime comedy films
American crime comedy films
Films based on American novels
Films with screenplays by Dudley Nichols
Fox Film films
1930 comedy films
1930s English-language films
1930s American films